Altadena ("Alta", Spanish for "Upper", and "dena" from Pasadena) is an unincorporated area and census-designated place in the Verdugo Mountains region of Los Angeles County, California, approximately 14 miles (23 km) from the downtown Los Angeles Civic Center, and directly north of the city of Pasadena, California. The population was 42,777 at the 2010 census, up from 42,610 at the 2000 census.

Etymology 
The name Altadena derives from the Spanish alta, meaning "upper", and dena from Pasadena; the area is adjacent to, but at a higher elevation than, Pasadena.

History
In the mid-1860s, Benjamin S. Eaton first developed water sources from the Arroyo Seco and Eaton Canyon to irrigate his vineyard near the edge of Eaton Canyon. This made possible the development of Altadena, Pasadena, and South Pasadena. They hoped to develop and sell this land in a real estate plan called the San Pasqual Plantation. Their efforts failed by 1870, despite Eaton's irrigation ditch that drew water from the site of present-day Jet Propulsion Laboratory (JPL) in the Arroyo Seco, because the land was relatively inaccessible and few believed crops could thrive that close to the mountains.

Eaton tried to sell the land for the partners, and in late 1873 he helped broker a deal with Daniel Berry, who represented a group of investors from Indiana, to buy  of the rancho. This included the land of present-day Altadena, but they developed a  section further south as Pasadena. In 1881, the land that would later become Altadena was sold to John and Fred Woodbury, brothers who launched the subdivision of Altadena in 1887. The land remained primarily agricultural, though several eastern millionaires built mansions along Mariposa Street, and a small community developed through the 1890s and into the next century.

In 1880, Capt. Frederick Woodbury, and his brother, John Woodbury of Marshalltown, Iowa, purchased  known as the Woodbury Ranch. John Woodbury established the Pasadena Improvement Company in 1887, with a plot plan of residential development referred to as the Woodbury Subdivision. They contacted Byron O. Clark, who established a nursery in the foothills in 1875, and had since moved away. He called his nursery "Altadena Nursery", a name he coined from the Spanish "alta" meaning "upper", and "dena" from Pasadena. Woodbury asked if he could use the name "Altadena" for his subdivision and Clark agreed.

The newly sprouted community of Altadena immediately began to attract millionaires from the East. In 1887 Andrew McNally, the printing magnate from Chicago, and his friend, George Gill Green, had built mansions on what was to become Millionaire's Row; Mariposa Street near Santa Rosa Avenue. Newspaper moguls William Armiger Scripps and William Kellogg built homes side by side just east of Fair Oaks Avenue. A bit farther east, Zane Grey bought a home from Arthur Herbert Woodward, and added a second-floor study. The famous Benziger Publishing Company built a mansion on the corner of Santa Rosa Avenue (Christmas Tree Lane) and Mariposa. Mariposa was taken from the Spanish name for a butterfly. The grandson of Andrew McNally, Wallace Neff, became a famous Southern California architect. He started his career in Altadena with the design and construction of St. Elizabeth of Hungary Catholic Church (parish est. 1918), which was dedicated in October 1926.

Redlining policies prevented African Americans from acquiring land or purchasing property in much of California. One of the areas exempt from these policies was Altadena Meadows, which thrived and became one of first middle-class African American neighborhoods in the area.

Over the years, Altadena has been subject to attempted annexation by Pasadena. Annexation was stopped in 1956 by community campaigns, though it has been resurrected several times since by Pasadena without success. Had the annexation succeeded, Pasadena would be the 108th largest city in the United States.

While Altadena long refused wholesale annexation by neighboring Pasadena, the larger community nibbled at its edges in several small annexations of neighborhoods through the 1940s. With early-1960s redevelopment in Pasadena, the routing of extensions of the 134 and 210 freeways, and lawsuits over the desegregation of Pasadena Unified School District, there was white flight and convulsive racial change in Altadena. In 1960, its black population was under four percent; over the next 15 years, half the White population left, and was replaced by people of color, many of whom settled on the west side of town after being displaced by Pasadena's redevelopment and freeway projects.

In 1993, the Kinneloa Fire, begun accidentally on the slopes above Eaton Canyon, burned dozens of homes in Altadena and neighboring Kinneloa Mesa as part of a rash of late October wildfires driven by Santa Ana winds in Southern California. One man died of complications from smoke inhalation and dozens were injured.

In 2022, Altadena gained local coverage in Los Angeles as the place of the first land return to the Tongva since the arrival of Europeans in the Los Angeles Basin area, after a resident donated her 1 acre property to the Tongva Taraxat Paxaavxa Conservancy. It was described as marking the first time in nearly 200 years that the Tongva have had land in Los Angeles County.

Altadena gained national media coverage, as it was the location where a single lottery ticket was sold to Ediwn Castro, which would win a world record $2.04 billion USD Powerball jackpot.

Geography

Climate 
Altadena experiences hot and dry summers that are followed by warm and windy falls and mild winters. According to the Köppen climate classification system, Altadena has a hot-summer Mediterranean climate, abbreviated Csa on climate maps. 

Altadena averages  of rain a year, over  more than nearby Los Angeles due to the orographic effect created by the San Gabriel Mountains. Because of the slope on which the city is built, sewer lines in the city's northern section have been known to overflow significantly.

Demographics

2020
The 2020 United States census reported that Altadena had a population of 42,846. The racial makeup of Altadena was (53.2%) White (41.2% Non-Hispanic White), (19.7%) African American, (0.6%) Native American, (5.2%) Asian, (0.1%) Pacific Islander, and (6.9%) from two or more races. Hispanic or Latino of any race, (29.5%).

2010
The 2010 United States census reported that Altadena had a population of 42,777. The racial makeup of Altadena was 22,569 (52.8%) White (40.3% Non-Hispanic White), 10,136 (23.7%) African American, 300 (0.7%) Native American, 2,307 (5.4%) Asian, 71 (0.2%) Pacific Islander, 4,852 (11.3%) from other races, and 2,542 (5.9%) from two or more races. Hispanic or Latino of any race were 11,502 persons (26.9%).

The Census reported that 42,276 people (98.8% of the population) lived in households, 234 (0.5%) lived in non-institutionalized group quarters, and 267 (0.6%) were institutionalized.

There were 15,212 households, out of which 5,170 (34.0%) had children under the age of 18 living in them, 7,684 (50.5%) were opposite-sex married couples living together, 2,210 (14.5%) had a female householder with no husband present, 814 (5.4%) had a male householder with no wife present. There were 661 (4.3%) unmarried opposite-sex partnerships, and 271 (1.8%) same-sex married couples or partnerships. 3,489 households (22.9%) were made up of individuals, and 1,318 (8.7%) had someone living alone who was 65 years of age or older. The average household size was 2.78. There were 10,708 families (70.4% of all households); the average family size was 3.26.

The age distribution of the city's population was as follows: 9,507 people (22.2%) were under the age of 18, 3,286 people (7.7%) aged 18 to 24, 10,622 people (24.8%) aged 25 to 44, 13,298 people (31.1%) aged 45 to 64, and 6,064 people (14.2%) who were 65 years of age or older. The median age was 41.8 years. For every 100 females, there were 93.1 males. For every 100 females age 18 and over, there were 89.2 males.

The homeowner vacancy rate was 0.9%; the rental vacancy rate was 4.9%. 30,319 people (70.9% of the population) lived in owner-occupied housing units and 11,957 people (28.0%) lived in rental housing units.

According to the 2010 United States Census, Altadena had a median household income of $82,895, with 10.7% of the population living below the federal poverty line.

2000
As of the 2000 United States census, there were 42,610 people, 14,780 households, and 10,671 families residing in the CDP. The racial makeup of the CDP was 47.30% White, 31.42% Black or African American, 0.58% Native American, 4.24% Asian, 0.13% Pacific Islander, 10.19% from other races, and 6.14% from two or more races. 20.39% of the population were Hispanic or Latino of any race.

There were 14,780 households, out of which 34.1% had children under the age of 18 living with them, 52.3% were married couples living together, 15.2% had a female householder with no husband present, and 27.8% were non-families. 21.8% of all households were made up of individuals, and 7.1% had someone living alone who was 65 years of age or older. The average household size was 2.82 and the average family size was 3.29.

In the CDP, the population was spread out, with 26.6% under the age of 18, 6.4% from 18 to 24, 30.1% from 25 to 44, 24.6% from 45 to 64, and 12.3% who were 65 years of age or older. The median age was 38 years. For every 100 females, there were 91.8 males. For every 100 females age 18 and over, there were 86.6 males.

The median income for a household in the CDP was $60,549, and the median income for a family was $66,800 (these figures had risen to $77,020 and $86,778 respectively as of a 2007 estimate). Males had a median income of $49,098 versus $38,054 for females. The per capita income for the CDP was $27,604. About 7.4% of families and 10.6% of the population were below the poverty line, including 14.1% of those under age 18 and 8.3% of those age 65 or over.

Arts and culture

Points of interest

Christmas Tree Lane is a  stretch of Santa Rosa Avenue from Woodbury Road to Altadena Drive. It has been a holiday attraction since 1920, and it is the oldest large-scale outdoor Christmas lighting venue in the world. Each December, members of the Christmas Tree Lane Association festoon the 110 still standing giant deodars that line the street with thousands of Christmas lights. Christmas Tree Lane was placed on the National Register of Historic Places in 1990, and is a California Historical Landmark.

Among Altadena's Christmas lighting attractions was the Balian Mansion, which drew people worldwide for tours of its Christmas lighting display. The Balian Mansion display was lit during the holiday season from 1955 to 2016, and is arguably the pioneer of home holiday lighting. The Balian home is located just east of Allen Avenue, at the 3-point junction of Mendocino Street, Mendocino Lane, and Glenview Terrace.

The historic Mount Lowe Railway was a scenic railway that once carried passengers to any of four resort hotels high in the San Gabriel Mountains above Altadena and Pasadena. Chaney Trail, just west of the intersection at Fair Oaks Avenue and Loma Alta Street, is a forestry service road leading to the old right of way. The Mount Lowe Railway site was placed on the National Register of Historic Places in 1993.

Altadena has a number of hiking trails, including the trail to the Dawn Mine, which can be reached via Chaney Trail to Sunset Ridge Trail. Arrows painted on large boulders direct hikers along the way.

The Cobb Estate at the top of Lake Avenue is now a free botanical garden, operated by the United States Forest Service. It is guarded by its historic gates, which are easily bypassed to allow visitors and hikers to ascend its long and winding paved driveway to the site of what was once one of Altadena's premier mansions. This site is also found alongside the Sam Merrill Trail, which accesses Las Flores Canyon on the way to Echo Mountain.

Gen. Charles S. Farnsworth County Park, located on Lake Avenue, is a large county park that offers picnic grounds, play areas, and a clubhouse and amphitheater. It was placed on the National Register of Historic Places in 1997.

Crudely Hewn Tombstone is the final resting place of abolitionist and Harpers Ferry attack survivor Owen Brown. The Tombstone, which is the only known memorial for Owen Brown, reads: "Owen Brown, son of John Brown, the Liberator, died Jan. 9, 1889, aged 64 years.” and is located on Round Top Hill near Brown Mountain in an isolated part of the Angeles National Forest.

Altadena also houses the Bunny Museum, which holds more than 35,000 rabbit-related items across 16 galleries in a  space.

Infrastructure
The Los Angeles County Sheriff's Department (LASD) operates the Altadena Station in Altadena.

The California Highway Patrol operates the Altadena Area Office on Windsor Dr. in Altadena.

Altadena is a shared jurisdiction where L.A. County Sheriff's Dept. handles crime-related calls and CHP handles traffic-related calls.

The Los Angeles County Department of Health Services operates the Monrovia Health Center in Monrovia, serving Altadena.

Notable people 

 Claude Akins, actor
 Maria Bamford, stand-up comedian
 Ramses Barden, NFL player
 Al Boeke, architect and developer of Sea Ranch, California
 Aja Brown, mayor of Compton, California
 Owen Brown, abolitionist
 Octavia E. Butler, author
 Andre Coleman, reporter and author
 Fannie Charles Dillon, composer
 Richard Feynman, Nobel Prize-winning physicist, was a resident.
 Jonathan Gold, Pulitzer Prize-winning restaurant critic
 Zane Grey, author
 Keith Hufnagel, professional skateboarder, was a resident
 Rodney King, victim of police beating
 Bob Lillis, Major League Baseball player and coach
 Paul Little, adult entertainment director and actor
 Mo Martin, LPGA golfer
 Andrew McNally - Businessman and publisher. He died in Altadena.
 Jim Merritt, Major League Baseball pitcher
 Sona Movsesian, assistant of Conan O'Brien
 Roger Nelson, Major League Baseball pitcher
 Marni Nixon, singer
 George Reeves, actor, Adventures of Superman
 Nathaniel Rosen, classical cellist
 Steve Sailer, author, blogger, and movie critic
 Michael Shermer, founder of The Skeptics Society and Editor in Chief of its magazine, Skeptic
 Ethelynde Smith, concert singer and botanical painter
 Adam Steltzner, spacecraft engineer
 Darryl Stephens Actor
 Jeffrey C. Stewart Pulitzer prize winner and Professor 
 Sharon Stouder, swimmer, three gold medals in 1964 Summer Olympics
 Meshach Taylor, Emmy-nominated actor, Designing Women 
 Leslie Van Houten, Manson Family member serving life sentence for murder 
 Mark Dean Veca, artist
 Alice Walker, author of The Color Purple
 James Westerfield, actor
 Charles White (artist) printmaker and draftsman 
 Harold Zirin, solar astronomer, founder of the Big Bear Solar Observatory
 Jirayr Zorthian, artist

References

Further reading
 Ives, Sarah Noble, Altadena. Pasadena, California: The Star-News Publishing Co., 1938. Out of print.
 Peterson, Robert H. Altadena's Golden Years. Alhambra, California: Sinclair Printing and Litho, Inc., 1976.
 Zack, Michele. Altadena: Between Wilderness and City. Altadena, California: Altadena Historical Society, 2004.

External links

 Altadena Town Council
 Altadena Chamber of Commerce

 
1887 establishments in California
Census-designated places in California
Census-designated places in Los Angeles County, California
Populated places established in 1887
San Gabriel Valley
Unincorporated communities in California
Unincorporated communities in Los Angeles County, California